Tittel is a surname. Notable people with the surname include:

Dušan Tittel (born 1966), Slovak footballer and manager
Ed Tittel (born 1952), American writer
Ellen Tittel (born 1953), German Olympic runner
Kevin Tittel (born 1994), German footballer

See also
Kittel (surname)